David K. Israel (born in Philadelphia, Pennsylvania) is a composer, author, screenwriter, director and producer. In high school, he studied composition with jazz artist Pat Martino and the two musicians went on to co-write and record an album of songs together in 1987.    In 1991, he was hired by The Estate of Leonard Bernstein to help edit and publish the late composer’s works. Mr. Israel worked on definitive editions of West Side Story, Mass, On the Town, and Wonderful Town. During these years he also worked as a professional composer fulfilling commissions by such groups as The American Symphony Orchestra, Twyla Tharp Dance, and The Paul Taylor Dance Company.

Mr. Israel has most recently been commissioned by New York City Ballet to compose the score for a new ballet with choreographer Silas Farley. The still untitled work is set to premiere at the 50th anniversary of the Stravinsky Festival at Lincoln Center in 2022.

On November 23, 2015, it was announced that Mr. Israel is writing a film about choreographer George Balanchine.

On September 14, 2017, it was announced that Mr. Israel is co-writing a TV series with director R.J. Cutler about the impeachment of President Clinton. To be produced by Fremantle Studios, the series has been ordered to series by History Channel.

Mr. Israel has also set up a TV drama series about Wolfgang Amadeus Mozart with director Adam Shankman.  Global Road will produce, according to an article published in Variety in October, 2019.

Mr. Israel's first novel, Behind Everyman  was published by Random House (Ballantine 2005). His writing has also appeared in The New York Times, the Los Angeles Times, and mental_floss magazine, among others. He has written and worked for JPL/NASA and is a frequent writer for the NPR show "Ask Me Another."

References

External links
David Israel - Official website

David Israel, Random House - Random House

Living people
1967 births
American male composers
21st-century American composers
21st-century American male musicians